Pisharikavu Temple is a temple located at Kollam, Koyilandy, Kozhikode district, North Malabar region of Kerala state of south India.

Myth about the temple 
Centuries before remaining members of the "Ettuveettil" family after the conspiracy against Marthanda Varma settled down in the village named Kollam near present-day Koyilandy in Kozhikode district. They were rich diamond merchants. One of family member prayed and did tapas to please goddess Badhra Kali. One night the goddess Sri Porkali (the family goddess of Ettuveettil pilla's) appeared in his dream and gave him a very special sword named "Nandhakam" and told him to pray her in the form of this sword and she will answer all his prayers and also asked him to go to his home town. He went back to his hometown and built a temple and started worshiping the Nandakkam sword. The family by the grace of mother Badhra Kali became very rich and powerful. They paid Samoothiri-King of Kozhikode and brought a land there and settled down there with their family and built a beautiful temple here and worshiped the Nandakkam sword, it is believed that 8 families have migrated from the south, namely Kiziyil, Vazhayil, Elayedathu, Echarathil, Punathil, Nanothu, Mundakkal, Erothu. Native people called them "vyapari"(merchants) at that time. Later name changed to "Ravari" in colloquial language. The community is existing even now and they have special rights for conducting a festival called "Kaliyattam".

Main festivals of Pisharikavu
The annual festival of Sri Pisharikavu Temple is celebrated in the Malayala month of "Meenam". The festival is celebrated with pomp for 8 days. The 7th day is celebrated as "Valiya Vilaku", and the 8th day is celebrated as "Kaliyattom", on which the divine Nandhakam sword is brought in procession around the temple on 7th and 8th day on a fully decorated female elephant, and traditional art form of Kerala is also staged in the temple. The Navarathri is also celebrated in a big way in the temple..

Divine sword Nandhakam
The sword was given to the devotee who did very strong austerity and prayed to Porkali Devi. The pleased Porkali Devi blessed the devotee of Vaishya community, saying that she will fulfill all wishes of him prayed with pure devotion. After so many centuries later also the Nandhakam sword stays as a divine representation of Pisharikavu Devi to all devotees who take refuge to the mother Pisharikavyilamma. The divine words of Sri Pisharikavilamma is that "Believe I am there with you where were you are irrespective of anyplace you are...proves that the divine mother would rescue her devotee if they believe and pray with full heart devotion anywhere they are."

See also
Temples of Kerala
Ettuveetil Pillamar
Marthanda Varma

References

Hindu temples in Kozhikode district